John Irwin is an American television producer and entertainment executive.

Career
From 1993 to 1996, Irwin was a producer for Late Night with Conan O'Brien. From 1997 to 1999, he was a producer for Mad TV. He also serves as Vice President of Development and Production for Lorne Michaels’ Broadway Video for five years.

Irwin was the Executive Producer for seven seasons on the VH1 series Celebrity Rehab with Dr. Drew. From 2012 to 2015  he served as the Executive Producer of Couples Therapy for VH1.

Irwin is the President of Irwin Entertainment, Inc., a film production company specializing in developing comedy, reality, scripted and live entertainment programming. Irwin founded the Los Angeles-based company in 2004, and has done projects with networks including NBC, VH1, E!, Netflix, Comedy Central, Oxygen, and Freeform.

Select filmography

Film / documentary

Television

References

External links
Irwin Entertainment Home Page
IMDb Irwin Entertainment

Sex Rehab with Dr. Drew - VH1.com
Celebrity Rehab with Dr. Drew - VH1.com
All Jacked Up - CMT.com
Reuters
Blabbermouth.net

American television producers
Living people
Year of birth missing (living people)